The list of ship launches in 1885 includes a chronological list of some ships launched in 1885.


References

See also 

1885
 
1885 in transport